The Ghana men's national under-18 basketball team is a national basketball team of Ghana, administered by the Ghana Basketball Association (GBBA).
It represents the country in international under-18 (under age 18) basketball competitions.

See also
Ghana men's national basketball team

References

External links
Archived records of Ghana team participations

Basketball teams in Ghana
Men's national under-18 basketball teams
Basketball